Jean Gabriel Marie (1907–1970) was a French composer.

Works
His works included the opera Mirèio, which was awarded the Prix de l'Académie des Arts, Lettres, et Sciences shortly after its premier in 1939. The composition was based on the Provençal poem that inspired Gounod's opera Mireille. He wrote Suite provençale in six movements, which is occasionally performed, based on themes from the opera. Chamber music and organ works are significant among his other compositions.

Career
He directed of the Institut Gabriel-Marie in Marseille for many years until his death at age 63.

Biography
His father, Jean Gabriel-Marie, was also a composer.

References

French classical composers
French male classical composers
French opera composers
Male opera composers
1907 births
1970 deaths
20th-century classical composers
20th-century French composers
20th-century French male musicians